Stephen Hunter Flick (born June 21, 1949, in Evanston, Illinois)  is an American sound editor with over 170 film credits.

Oscar Nominations
All of these are in Best Sound Editing, with one being a Special achievement award.
 1982 Academy Awards-nominated for Poltergeist, nomination shared with Richard L. Anderson. Lost to E.T. the Extra-Terrestrial.
 1987 Academy Awards-Received the Special Achievement Academy Award for RoboCop. Shared the award with John Pospisil.
 1988 Academy Awards-Nominated for Die Hard. Nomination shared with Richard Shorr. Lost to Who Framed Roger Rabbit.
 1990 Academy Awards-Nominated for Total Recall. Lost to The Hunt for Red October.
 1994 Academy Awards-Speed. Won.

References

External links
 

American sound editors
Best Sound Editing Academy Award winners
Best Sound BAFTA Award winners
Special Achievement Academy Award winners
Living people
1949 births
People from Evanston, Illinois
Emmy Award winners